Andrew Potts may refer to:

Andrew-Lee Potts (born 1979), British actor
Andrew R. Potts (1853–1932), American politician
Andy Potts (born 1976), American athlete